The Phoenix Shot Tower, also known as the Old Baltimore Shot Tower, is a red brick shot tower,  tall, located near the downtown, Jonestown (also known later as Old Town), and Little Italy communities of East Baltimore, in Maryland. When it was completed in 1828 it was the tallest structure in the United States.

The tower was originally known as the "Phoenix Shot Tower", then the "Merchants' Shot Tower", and now is also sometimes called the "Old Baltimore Shot Tower". It is the only surviving shot tower among four that existed in Baltimore. The structure was designated a National Historic Landmark on November 11, 1971 and as a local Baltimore City Landmark on October 14, 1975.

The Shot Tower lends its name to the nearby Shot Tower/Market Place station on the Baltimore Metro subway system's northeast line. Additionally, the original Baltimore Bullets were named in honor of its role in producing shot, as was the team that is now known as the Washington Wizards.

Design
The tower was built by Jacob Wolfe using bricks manufactured by the Burns and Russell Company of Baltimore.  Charles Carroll of Carrollton, a Roman Catholic lay leader, wealthiest man in America at that time and the only surviving signer of the Declaration of Independence, laid its cornerstone on 4 July 1828. It was completed the same year.

Production

Molten lead was dropped from a platform at the top of the tower, through a sieve-like device, into a vat of cold water at the bottom of the tower to produce "drop shot" for muskets.  When hardened, dried, and polished, the shot was sorted into 25-pound bags. The annual production was about 100,000 bags of shot, with the capability of doubling that in case of high demand.

The tower stopped producing shot in 1892, when a new method of making shot made the tower obsolete.  It re-opened for a brief period of production at the beginning of the twentieth century, and then closed for good.

History 
The tower remained the tallest structure in the United States until 1846, when Trinity Church, New York on Wall Street was erected, and the tallest in Baltimore until the completion of the spire of the First Presbyterian Church at West Madison Street and Park Avenue in the Mount Vernon-Belvedere neighborhood in 1875.

The shot tower was originally owned by the Merchants' Shot Tower Company which closed in 1898.

In 1921 the tower was purchased for $14,500 by the Union Oil Company, which planned to tear it down and put a gas station in its place.  After strong objections by the community, by 1928 enough money had been raised to purchase the tower and present it to the City of Baltimore as one of its first preserved local historic landmarks.

The tower was designated a National Historic Landmark in 1971 and a bronze plaque was attached to the tower's brick wall at the base.  In the early 1980s, the management, exhibits, and tours were combined with those of the former Peale Museum.  In 1985, other historic sites and homes were added to the newly created Baltimore City Life Museums system.  The BCLM was closed in 1997, and in 2002 Carroll Museums Inc. was created to manage both the Carroll Mansion and the Shot Tower.

References

External links

Phoenix Shot Tower - web page by Carroll Museums, the organization that maintains the tower as a museum
Baltimore, Maryland, a National Park Service Discover Our Shared Heritage Travel Itinerary
Phoenix Shot Tower on Google Street View
Explore Baltimore Heritage - Phoenix Shot Tower

, including undated photo, at Maryland Historical Trust

National Historic Landmarks in Maryland
Shot towers
Towers completed in 1828
Industry museums in Maryland
Museums in Baltimore
Downtown Baltimore
Historic American Buildings Survey in Baltimore
Industrial buildings and structures on the National Register of Historic Places in Baltimore
1828 establishments in Maryland
Baltimore City Landmarks